= Callaway Golf PGA Junior Series =

Children's golf tournament

The Callaway Golf PGA Junior Series began in 1996, and has attracted boy and girl golfers representing 50 states, the District of Columbia, 22 countries/territories and international players. The Callaway Golf PGA Junior Series is organized and conducted by the Professional Golfers' Association of America.
